Nick Payne (born 1984) is a British playwright and screenwriter.

Early life and education
Payne studied at the University of York and subsequently at the Central School of Speech and Drama.  He is also a graduate of the Royal Court Young Writer's Program.

Career
In 2008 Payne worked at the bookshop of the National Theatre.  His first play If There Is I Haven't Found It Yet opened at the Bush Theatre in October 2009 and received a positive response from critics at the Evening Standard and the Financial Times.  It won the George Devine Award. In September 2012 it was staged at New York's Laura Pels Theatre, starring Jake Gyllenhaal.

Payne's second play Wanderlust opened in September 2010, directed by Simon Godwin, at the Royal Court Theatre upstairs and also garnered excellent reviews. In November, Payne was shortlisted for the Evening Standard's Most Promising Playwright Award, but lost out to Anya Reiss.

He took part in the Bush Theatre's 2011 project Sixty Six Books, for which he wrote a piece based upon a book of the King James Bible.

Constellations opened at Royal Court Theatre on 13 January 2012. Directed by Michael Longhurst and starring Rafe Spall and Sally Hawkins, it explores love, friendship and the notion of free will against the backdrop of quantum physics. It was extremely well received, with Charles Spencer in the Daily Telegraph commenting that "Nick Payne's drama lasts just over an hour but packs in more than most shows manage in three times that length. It is playful, intelligent and bursting with ideas, but also achieves a powerful undertow of emotion" while Paul Taylor in the Independent wrote that "one would be hard put to begin to do justice to the dazzling way it creates  rules, while at the same time being wise enough not to jettison the old rule book either". It transferred to the Duke of York's Theatre in November 2012. That month it won the Evening Standard Theatre Award for Best Play. In January 2013 Payne revealed that a film adaptation was under way. This plan was later shelved.

In August 2013 his play The Same Deep Water As Me opened at the Donmar Warehouse, with a cast including Nigel Lindsay, Daniel Mays and Marc Wootton. In January 2014 Blurred Lines, a piece he devised with the director Carrie Cracknell, opened at the National Theatre's Shed. In 2014, two episodes of The Secrets which were written by Payne were broadcast on BBC One.

Incognito was a co-production between Live Theatre, nabokov, HighTide Festival Theatre and in association with The North Wall in spring 2014, which previewed at Live Theatre in April 2014, before going to HighTide Festival and The North Wall, Oxford. It returned to Live Theatre in May and then had a sell-out run at The Bush Theatre, London. Incognito was produced Off-Broadway (in New York) by the Manhattan Theatre Club with support from the Alfred P. Sloan Foundation at New York's City Center in 2016. The play stars Charlie Cox, Heather Lind, Morgan Spector, and Geneva Carr and is directed by Doug Hughes.

The American premiere of Constellations opened on Broadway in January 2015 at Manhattan Theatre Club's Samuel J. Friedman Theatre, starring Academy Award nominee Jake Gyllenhaal and Ruth Wilson. Constellations reunites Gyllenhaal with Payne and Longhurst, who are also making their Broadway debuts with the production. The three previously collaborated on the American premiere of If There Is I Haven't Found It Yet. It is directed by Michael Longhurst. The play was next mounted in 2016 at Washington DC's Studio Theatre, starring Lily Balatincz and Tom Patterson and directed by Studio Theatre Artistic Director David Muse. The production was nominated for six Helen Hayes Awards, with Balatincz winning the Helen Hayes Award for Best Actress in a Play and Patterson winning the Helen Hayes Award for Best Actor in a Play. In November 2016, Constellations opened at Canadian Stage in Toronto, under the direction of Peter Hinton.

A Life ran Off-Broadway from February 2019 to March 2019 and transferred to Broadway at the Hudson Theatre in July 2019. The play ran with Sea Wall and starred Jake Gyllenhaal, directed by Carrie Cracknell. The plays were nominated for the 2020 Tony Award as best play.

Works

Stage
 Flourless rehearsed reading at the Soho Theatre 2006
 Lay Down Your Cross rehearsed reading at the Royal Court Theatre 2007
 Switzerland Hightide Theatre Festival 2008
 If There Is I Haven't Found It Yet Bush Theatre commissioned by Paines Plough 2009
 Wanderlust at Royal Court Theatre
 Starling reading at Royal Court as part of the Royal Court Young Writers Festival 2009
 The Lost Mariner 2010
 Interior adaptation of Maurice Maeterlinck's book The Gate Theatre 2010
 Wanderlust 2010
 One Day When We Were Young 2011 Paines Plough & Sheffield Theatres
 One of the short plays forming part of Sixty Six Books Bush Theatre
 Constellations 2012 Royal Court Theatre
 The Same Deep Water As Me 2013 Donmar Warehouse
 Incognito 2014 Hightide Festival and Bush Theatre
 The Art of Dying 2014 Royal Court Theatre
 Symphony 2014 (with Ella Hickson and Tom Wells) Nabokov and Soho Theatre
 Elegy 2016 Donmar Warehouse
 Incognito 2017 The Sandra Feinstein-Gamm Theatre
 A Life 2019 The Public Theater

Film
 The Sense of an Ending (2016) – Screenwriter

Television
 Wanderlust (2018) – Screenwriter

References

External links
Nick Payne's site at Macmillan Publishing House
Nick Payne's Profile at Curtis Brown

English dramatists and playwrights
Living people
English male dramatists and playwrights
1984 births